Las Coloradas is a community in the Rio Lagartos Municipality, Yucatán, Mexico. It is located at the northern coast of the Yucatan peninsula on a stretch of land which separates the Gulf of Mexico from the lagoon Ria Lagartos.

Huge salt evaporation ponds for sea salt extraction lie on this stretch of land, some of them showing peculiar colors due to micro organisms, like the pink lagoon Laguna Rosa. Flamingo and bird watching is common here, close to a bioreserve.  The town and the pink lagoons have now become a popular tourist attraction, thanks to Instagram posts which make the lakes appear much more romantic than they really are.  The lakes are certainly intriguing but are difficult to get to without a tour or a hire car.  Tours can be arranged to see the resident flamingos and other birds, including a stop at the coloured lakes if requested.

References

Populated places in Yucatán